The Parliamentary Council was a constitutional authority in Sri Lanka established under the 18th Amendment to the Constitution of Sri Lanka. Formally being constituted on January 1, 2011 as per the 18th Amendment, it replaces the Constitutional Council that was established under the 17th Amendment. After Maithripala Sirisena was elected President, Prime Minister Ranil Wickremesinghe presented the new reforms to reinstate a new Constitutional Council in 2015 under the Nineteenth Amendment.

Powers and tasks
Compared to the ten member Constitutional Council, which made approval of names of nominees to the independent committees/commissions mandatory; the Parliamentary Council has powers only to recommend persons to the independent committees. The sole authority of appointing members of the independent committees was vested with the President of Sri Lanka and while he is needed to seek the observations of the council, its decisions are not binding.

Commissions
The Council recommends members to several independent committees/commissions. These are;

 Public Service Commission
 Human Rights Commission
 Elections Commission
 National Police Commission
 Commission to Investigate Allegation of Bribery or Corruption
 Finance Commission
 Delimitation Commission.

Membership
The membership of the Parliamentary Council was made up of five members, of whom three are ex officio members and two would be nominated to ensure ethnic representation. The Prime Minister, the Opposition Leader and the Speaker are compulsory members of the committee. The Prime Minister and the Opposition Leader can nominate one person each to the committee from the communities to which the compulsory members do not belong.
 
 Ex officio Members 
 Hon. D. M. Jayaratne - Prime Minister of Sri Lanka
 Hon. Chamal Rajapaksa - Speaker of the Parliament of Sri Lanka
 Hon. Ranil Wickremesinghe - Leader of the Opposition 

 Nominated Members 
 Hon. D. M. Swaminathan - Member of Parliament  
 Hon. A.H.M. Azwer - Member of Parliament  

 Secretary to the Parliamentary Council 
Dhammika Kitulgoda - Secretary General of Parliament

Location
The Council sits at the Sri Lankan Parliament Building in Sri Jayawardenepura Kotte.

See also
Constitutional Council (Sri Lanka)

References

Government of Sri Lanka

2011 establishments in Sri Lanka
2015 disestablishments in Sri Lanka